Thomas Neil Goodwin (born 8 November 1979) is an English football defender.

Career
Goodwin first entered the senior picture with Leicester City during their heavy pre-season schedule of 1999, earning a Premier League appearance in the injury-hit side that lost at home to West Ham United as Leicester tried to patch up its wounded for the impending League Cup semi-finals and still found itself applauded from the pitch. Goodwin didn't make another appearance for the Foxes and less than a year later found himself attempting to impress in reserve football at Northampton Town, Barnet, Peterborough United and Kidderminster Harriers, prior to his release by Leicester. On settling at Shepshed Dynamo, Goodwin also briefly assumed the Commercial Manager's role there and faced Leicester in the 2003 County Challenge Cup Final. In early 2006, he received a six-month ban from football after a bitterly contested allegation that he attacked a linesman during Quorn's match at Boldmere.

References

Since 1888... The Searchable Premiership and Football League Player Database (subscription required)

1979 births
Living people
Footballers from Leicester
English footballers
Association football defenders
Leicester City F.C. players
Shepshed Dynamo F.C. players
Hinckley United F.C. players
Solihull Borough F.C. players
Quorn F.C. players
Premier League players